The Lansing Symphony Orchestra (LSO) is an American symphony orchestra headquartered in Lansing, Michigan.  It was founded in 1929 under the leadership of its first Music Director, Izler Solomon.  Since 2006, the orchestra has been headed by Music Director Timothy Muffitt.

The LSO presents a wide variety of orchestral programming throughout its seasons.  The 2009/2010 Season - "Escape the Everyday" includes a six-concert classical MasterWorks Series, a three-concert Pops Series, a four-concert Chamber Series, two Big Band concerts, a Halloween Spooktacular Family Concert and a performance of Handel's Messiah.

MasterWorks and Pops concerts are performed at the Wharton Center for the Performing Arts on the campus of Michigan State University. Chamber concerts are performed at Plymouth Congregational Church in Lansing. Big Band concerts are performed at Dart Auditorium on the campus of Lansing Community College.

Music Directors & Conductors

1929-1936    Izler Solomon
1936-1939    Marius Fossenkemper
1939-1941    Pedro Paz
1941-1962    Romeo Tata
1962-1964    Gregory Millar
1964-1967    Hugo Vianello
1967-1978    A. Clyde Roller
1978         Gustav Meier, Max Bragado-Darman, Larynx Palomo 
1979-2006    Gustav Meier
2006–present Timothy Muffitt

External links
www.lansingsymphony.org

Musical groups established in 1929
Orchestras based in Michigan
Culture of Lansing, Michigan
Ingham County, Michigan
Michigan State University
Economy of Lansing, Michigan
Tourist attractions in Lansing, Michigan
1929 establishments in Michigan